The 2018 Japan Open (officially known as the Daihatsu Yonex Japan Open 2018 for sponsorship reasons) was a badminton tournament which took place at Musashino Forest Sport Plaza in Tokyo, Japan, from 11 to 16 September 2018 and had a total prize of $700,000.

Tournament
The 2018 Japan Open was the sixteenth tournament of the 2018 BWF World Tour and also part of the Japan Open championships, which had been held since 1977. This tournament was organized by Nippon Badminton Association, and sanctioned by the BWF.

Venue
This international tournament was held at Musashino Forest Sport Plaza in Tokyo, Japan.

Point distribution
Below is the point distribution table for each phase of the tournament based on the BWF points system for the BWF World Tour Super 750 event.

Prize money
The total prize money for this tournament was US$700,000. Distribution of prize money was in accordance with BWF regulations.

Men's singles

Seeds

 Viktor Axelsen (semi-finals)
 Shi Yuqi (first round)
 Kento Momota (champion)
 Son Wan-ho (second round)
 Chou Tien-chen (second round)
 Chen Long (quarter-finals)
 Srikanth Kidambi (quarter-finals)
 Ng Ka Long (first round)

Finals

Top half

Section 1

Section 2

Bottom half

Section 3

Section 4

Women's singles

Seeds

 Tai Tzu-ying (second round)
 Akane Yamaguchi (quarter-finals)
 P. V. Sindhu (second round)
 Ratchanok Intanon (quarter-finals)
 Chen Yufei (semi-finals)
 Carolina Marín (champion)
 He Bingjiao (withdrew)
 Nozomi Okuhara (final)

Finals

Top half

Section 1

Section 2

Bottom half

Section 3

Section 4

Men's doubles

Seeds

 Marcus Fernaldi Gideon / Kevin Sanjaya Sukamuljo (champions)
 Li Junhui / Liu Yuchen (final)
 Takeshi Kamura / Keigo Sonoda (second round)
 Liu Cheng / Zhang Nan (first round)
 Mathias Boe / Carsten Mogensen (second round)
 Mads Conrad-Petersen / Mads Pieler Kolding (first round)
 Takuto Inoue / Yuki Kaneko (first round)
 Kim Astrup / Anders Skaarup Rasmussen (second round)

Finals

Top half

Section 1

Section 2

Bottom half

Section 3

Section 4

Women's doubles

Seeds

 Yuki Fukushima / Sayaka Hirota (champions)
 Misaki Matsutomo / Ayaka Takahashi (second round)
 Chen Qingchen / Jia Yifan (final)
 Greysia Polii / Apriyani Rahayu (semi-finals)
 Shiho Tanaka / Koharu Yonemoto (first round)
 Jongkolphan Kititharakul / Rawinda Prajongjai (quarter-finals)
 Lee So-hee / Shin Seung-chan (first round)
 Mayu Matsumoto / Wakana Nagahara (quarter-finals)

Finals

Top half

Section 1

Section 2

Bottom half

Section 3

Section 4

Mixed doubles

Seeds

 Zheng Siwei / Huang Yaqiong (champions)
 Wang Yilü / Huang Dongping (final)
 Tontowi Ahmad / Liliyana Natsir (withdrew)
 Tang Chun Man / Tse Ying Suet (second round)
 Zhang Nan / Li Yinhui (quarter-finals)
 Goh Soon Huat / Shevon Jemie Lai (quarter-finals)
 Chris Adcock / Gabrielle Adcock (second round)
 Hafiz Faizal / Gloria Emanuelle Widjaja (second round)

Finals

Top half

Section 1

Section 2

Bottom half

Section 3

Section 4

References

External links
 Tournament Link

Japan Open (badminton)
Japan Open (badminton)
Japan Open (badminton)
Japan Open (badminton)